Cassius Xavier-Lamarr Winston (born February 28, 1998) is an American professional basketball player for Bayern Munich of the German Basketball Bundesliga (BBL) and the EuroLeague. He played college basketball for the Michigan State Spartans.

High school career
Winston, a 6'1 point guard, was a star prep player at University of Detroit Jesuit High School and Academy in Detroit. As a senior in 2016, he led his team to an MHSAA Class A State Championship, and was named Mr. Basketball of Michigan. Winston was inducted into the Catholic High School League Hall of Fame in 2020.

Recruiting

College career

He chose to attend college at Michigan State, and averaged 6.7 points and 5.2 assists per game in 35 games as a freshman. As a sophomore, he became a full-time starter, averaging 12.6 points and 6.9 assists per game for the Spartans, and earning third-team All-Big Ten Conference honors.

Entering into Winston's junior season, he was selected to the preseason All-Big Ten team. After a strong start to the year, he was named to the midseason watch list for the John R. Wooden Award. He would lead the Spartans to a 2019 Big Ten men's basketball tournament championship, being named Big Ten tournament Most Outstanding Player.

On March 11, 2019, Winston was named the Big Ten Player of the Year. On March 31, 2019, Winston scored 20 points along with 10 assists in a 68–67 win against Duke in the Elite Eight of the 2019 NCAA Division I men's basketball tournament.

Prior to the start of the 2019–20 season, Winston was unanimously named a preseason All-American by the Associated Press (AP), the only player so honored. On December 29, Winston missed a game against Western Michigan with a bone bruise in his knee. He scored a career-high 32 points along with nine assists in a 87–69 win over Michigan on January 5, 2020. Winston passed Mateen Cleaves' Big Ten record of 816 assists on January 17, in a win against Wisconsin. At the close of the regular season, Winston was named to the First Team All-Big Ten by the coaches and media. Winston averaged 18.3 points and 5.9 assists per game as a senior.

Professional career

Washington Wizards (2020–2022)
On November 18, 2020, Winston was drafted by the Oklahoma City Thunder with the 53rd overall pick in the 2020 NBA draft. His rights were subsequently traded to the Washington Wizards and on November 28, 2020, he was signed to a two-way contract. However, since Washington's affiliate, the Capital City Go-Go withdrew from the tournament, he was assigned to the Erie BayHawks for the NBA G League season, making his debut on February 10, 2021.

On August 19, 2021, Winston signed a second two-way contract with the Wizards. He appeared in 7 games for the Wizards during the 2021-2022 regular season.

Winston joined the Philadelphia 76ers for the 2022 NBA Summer League.

Bayern Munich (2022–present)
On July 28, 2022, Winston signed with German club Bayern Munich.

Career statistics

NBA

Regular season

|-
| style="text-align:left;"| 
| style="text-align:left;"| Washington
| 22 || 0 || 4.5 || .424 || .471 || .833 || .4 || .5 || .1 || .0 || 1.9
|-
| style="text-align:left;"| 
| style="text-align:left;"| Washington
| 7 || 0 || 5.6 || .364 || .333 || 1.000 || .1 || 1.0 || .0 || .0 || 2.0
|- class="sortbottom"
| style="text-align:center;" colspan="2"| Career
| 29 || 0 || 4.7 || .409 || .435 || .900 || .3 || .7 || .1 || .0 || 1.9

Playoffs

|-
| style="text-align:left;"| 2021
| style="text-align:left;"| Washington
| 1 || 0 || 5.0 || .333 || .000 || — || 2.0 || 1.0 || .0 || .0 || 2.0
|- class="sortbottom"
| style="text-align:center;" colspan="2"| Career
| 1 || 0 || 5.0 || .333 || .000 || — || 2.0 || 1.0 || .0 || .0 || 2.0

College

|-
| style="text-align:left;"| 2016–17
| style="text-align:left;"| Michigan State
| 35 || 5 || 20.7 || .423 || .380 || .775 || 1.8 || 5.2 || .7 || .1 || 6.7
|-
| style="text-align:left;"| 2017–18
| style="text-align:left;"| Michigan State
| 35 || 34 || 28.1 || .507 || .497 || .900 || 3.4 || 6.9 || .7 || .1 || 12.6
|-
| style="text-align:left;"| 2018–19
| style="text-align:left;"| Michigan State
| 39 || 39 || 33.5 || .460 || .398 || .840 || 3.0 || 7.5 || 1.0 || .1 || 18.8
|-
| style="text-align:left;"| 2019–20
| style="text-align:left;"| Michigan State
| 30 || 30 || 32.7 || .448 || .432 || .852 || 2.5 || 5.9 || 1.2 || .0 || 18.6
|- class="sortbottom"
| style="text-align:center;" colspan="2"| Career
| 139 || 108 || 28.8 || .461 || .430 || .845 || 2.7 || 6.4 || .9 || .1 || 14.2

Personal life
Winston has two younger brothers, Zachary and Khy, who played basketball at Albion College. On November 9, 2019, Zachary Winston was killed after being struck by a train.

See also
List of NCAA Division I men's basketball career assists leaders

References

External links
Michigan State Spartans bio
College statistics

1998 births
Living people
21st-century African-American sportspeople
All-American college men's basketball players
American expatriate basketball people in Germany
American men's basketball players
African-American basketball players
Basketball players from Detroit
Capital City Go-Go players
Erie BayHawks (2019–2021) players
FC Bayern Munich basketball players
Michigan State Spartans men's basketball players
Oklahoma City Thunder draft picks
Point guards
University of Detroit Jesuit High School and Academy alumni
Washington Wizards players